The Parliament of China may refer to:
 
The National People's Congress, the legislative body of the People's Republic of China
The tricameral parliament of the Republican China:
The National Assembly, the defunct legislature and electoral college of the Republic of China
The Control Yuan, the former upper house of the Chinese Parliament
The Legislative Yuan, the former lower house of the Chinese Parliament, but now operates as a unicameral parliament since 2005 in Taiwan.